Waterford city is situated in south eastern Ireland, on the river Suir [pronounced Shure] about  from where the river enters the sea. Practically the entire city is built on the south bank of the river. The "Old town", now the business centre, clusters behind the broad quay-front on a low-lying strip of land left behind by a gentle loop of the river at this point. From this, the land rises sharply to the east and opposite to the west while remaining level in between. The eastern slopes are almost entirely occupied by private residential estates, while the western and southwestern prominences are largely given over to local council housing development. There are corresponding elevations on the north bank eastwards towards Christendom and westwards towards Mount Misery nothing.

The rocks which form the base of the city all belong to the Palaeozoic Group – principally Ordovician shales underlying sandstone. On the East side of the city, the rock is crossed by an alluvial bank running N.E./S.W. At the cliffs alongside the banks of the River Suir, above Rice Bridge, inter-stratification of sharply-folded Ordovician Slates and Sandstone conglomerates may be clearly observed.

Waterford is Ireland's oldest city and is thought to have been founded by Vikings in the 9th century. It was taken over by Anglo-Norman invaders in the 12th century, and was one of the most important Old English centres in medieval Ireland. Since then it has seen sieges, invasions, famine and economic highs and lows. It remains the foremost city in Ireland's south-east.

See Rulers of Waterford for a list of the city's rulers from 914 to the present day.

Foundation

The foundation of Waterford is claimed in some quarters to have taken place late in prehistoric times. Other writers place the event about the middle of the 2nd century. However, it is difficult to go along any distance with either theory on the strength of the supporting evidence quoted.

There are references to Vikings living in the Waterford area in the years 860, 892 and 914, and the foundation of Waterford is generally dated to 914. A popular story of Waterford's origins tells that it was established by a Viking-chieftain named Sitric in 853. This account is based on an account by Gerald of Wales, and is challenged by Clare Downs in her article The historical importance of Viking-Age Waterford. An alternative origin myth is found in the 13th-century Ystoria Gruffudd ap Cynan – in which the Norwegian king Harald Finehair (c. 850 – c. 933) is said to have founded Dublin, and to have given Waterford to his brother.

This part of Ireland, in pre-Danish times, was inhabited primarily by pastoral shepherding peoples and those who made their living hunting. Towns were uncommon, excepting settlements surrounding monasteries. Seaports, in particular, were all but unheard of until the founding of Waterford, which began its history as a port town.

The Ostmen or Danes as they are more commonly called, persuaded by the rigours of their own inhospitable clime, had taken to the high seas in search of plunder. During the first half of the 9th century the shores of south-east Ireland were ravaged time after time by Danish expeditions, Ardmore and Lismore being the subjects of a number of raids. At the outset, these bellicose incursions took place only during the summer months, the raiders returning home with their spoils at the onset of winter, but later the Vikings built a permanent encampment. A number of factors influenced the choice of the site. The place provided a splendid anchorage. It was the lowest point at which the river could at that time be forded. Above all, the site could easily be defended. It was protected on three sides by water; in front by the Suir; on the east and at rear by St. John's River and the marshes flanking it. St. John's River did not then, as now, flow neatly between regular banks. Rather, its tortuous and uncontained stream meandered over much of the ground now occupied by Lombard Street, William Street, the People's Park, Catherine Street, and Parnell Street, turning this entire area into viscous marshland. These marshes also extended westwards round the back of the site of the old town. Only on the west itself were substantial fortifications necessary. This was Waterford in its infancy, a Danish stronghold, subject to constant harassment by the Irish outside the walls, who broke in on more than one occasion to lay waste the foreign colony.

Among the most prominent Kings of Waterford was Ivar of Waterford (d. 1000).

During the late 10th and early 11th centuries, the rise of Brian Bóruma saw Waterford and a number of other Viking ports being brought firmly under the control of the O'Brien dynasty. Control of these Viking ports was significant for would-be Irish High Kings as it granted greater access to international trade and manpower.

Anglo Norman invasion and medieval Waterford

The next phase in the life of Waterford began on 25 August 1170 when the city was taken by the Normans under Strongbow. The Normans had been casting eyes in this direction for some time prior, until MacMurrough's invitation gave them cause for coming. In 1137, Diarmuid MacMorrough, king of Leinster, failed in an attempt to take Waterford. He was trying to secure the large centres to advance his claim for high king of Ireland. In 1170 MacMorrough allied himself with Richard de Clare, 2nd Earl of Pembroke (Strongbow); together they besieged and took Waterford after a desperate defence. This was the introduction of the Anglo-Normans into Ireland. In 1171, Henry II of England became the first English king to set foot in an Irish city, by landing with a large fleet at Waterford; he did so to ensure that Ireland became an English colony and not a rival Norman country. Waterford and Dublin were declared royal cities, and belonged to the king, not Strongbow; Dublin was declared capital of Ireland. The next royal visitor, in 1185, was prince John, who granted the city's first Charter in 1205 thus starting City Government in Waterford. He revisited the city as king in 1211.  Richard II, too, visited Waterford twice, first in 1394 and again in 1399.

Throughout the medieval period, Waterford was Ireland's second city after Dublin. Waterford's great parchment book (1361–1649) represents the earliest use of the English language in Ireland for official purposes.

In 1487 the city refused to obey the direction of the Earl of Kildare to recognise Lambert Simnel as king and ten years later repulsed a second pretender, Perkin Warbeck. As a result, King Henry VII gave the city its motto: Urbs Intacta Manet Waterfordia (Waterford remains the untaken city). Printing was introduced into Waterford in 1550, the first book being printed in the city five years later. It was in 1588 that Duncannon was fortified as a precaution against Spanish attacks along the coast, which were being experienced at the time.

Area and extent – the city walls
Until recently there was no record of the extent of any settlement that may have existed at Waterford prior to the middle of the 9th century. The Danish colony founded about that time (853 AD) was triangular in shape and contained  approximately. This area was enclosed by stout ramparts linking Reginald's Tower with St. Martin's Castle (site in Spring Garden Alley); from thence running to Turgesius' Tower, which stood in the immediate vicinity of the Allied Irish Bank (corner of Barronstrand St) and returning along the river-front to Reginald's Tower.

Substantial remains of the wall in the 500-metre stretch between Reginald's Tower and St. Martin's Castle still exist, except where broken by the erection of the City Hall and the opening of Colbeck Street (former (Colbeck Gate). These traces may be observed between the houses of the Mall and Bailey's New Street and, further up, between Spring Garden Alley and Lady Lane, about 12 metres back from the northern frontage of the former. In the old handball alley, some four metres of the Wall—in places six metres high—stand exposed. Also, parts of the breastwork of St. Martin's Castle have been incorporated in the foundations and lower courses of the buildings that now stand on its former site.

There are a few traces at the wall linking St. Martin's Castle with Turgesius' Tower, and which followed the line of Michael Street and Broad Street, about sixteen to twenty metres back from the present eastern frontage of these streets.

The wall fronting the Quay has completely disappeared. It was demolished and the material thrown down to form the foundation of the present Quays, partly under the Cromwellian Commissioners in 1650 and totally by the Corporation of 1705, which improved and enlarged the Quays.
–

Religious war and upheavals

Waterford was occupied by Mountjoy in 1603 during the Nine Years War (Ireland) a rebellion led by Hugh O'Neill, ostensibly in the cause of Irish independence and the Catholic religion. Despite their own adherence to Catholicism, the townspeople largely sided with the English government forces. However, upon the coronation of James VI of Scotland as king of England in 1603, the citizens participated in an uprising that was common to the coastal cities of Munster and refused entry to Mountjoy, the king's Lord Deputy of Ireland, who had just secured the surrender of Hugh O'Neill. The motivation for Waterford's defiance lay in the people's demand for freedom of religion – they were led by Catholic priests and re-consecrated several churches in the city – although there were also mutterings about the nationality of the new king. After negotiations, Lord Mountjoy was granted entry to the city and the citizens pledged their loyalty anew.

However, Waterford's Roman Catholic population became deeply alienated from the English Protestant state in Ireland in the following 40 years. After the Irish Rebellion of 1641, Waterford was a centre of support for the Confederate Catholics of Ireland – a de facto independent Irish state formed to fight for Irish Catholic interests in the Irish Confederate Wars. Within the Confederation, Waterford was known for its militant Catholic politics – rejecting an alliance signed between the Confederates and Charles I that would have sent Irish troops to fight for the King in the English Civil War. Waterford was visited by the Papal Nuncio to Ireland, Giovanni Battista Rinuccini in 1648. The latter, in his "Report on the Affairs of Ireland" sent to Pope Innocent X, described Waterford as being "one of the only two Irish cities he would place in the front rank for reverence to the Holy See." In 1649 during the Cromwellian conquest of Ireland, the city was unsuccessfully besieged by Oliver Cromwell, but was forced to surrender to his Deputy, Henry Ireton, after a prolonged siege in the summer of the following year.

After the Battle of the Boyne in 1690, both James II and William of Orange came by Waterford, James on his way to France and William returning to England. It was soon after this, about 1700, that the Huguenots came to Waterford, sponsored by the English Protestant regime.

18th century Waterford
The 18th century was a period of huge prosperity for Waterford. Most of the city's best architecture appeared during this time. Trading with Newfoundland brought much wealth into what was then the third largest port in Ireland.

In 1783, George and William Penrose founded a glass factory, which would become Waterford Crystal, the most famous business in the city.

There was no armed uprising in the area as part of the 1798 Rebellion, as a result of the rebel defeat at Wexford. There was, however, considerable United Irishmen activity in the city and district, where secret recruitment had been going on apace. Among those arraigned for seditious activity at the time was the toll collector of the then five-year-old wooden bridge over the Suir.

A permanent military presence was established in the city with the completion of the Cavalry Barracks at the end of the 18th century.

Catholic Emancipation and Famine

In 1826, Waterford returned Henry Villiers-Stuart to Parliament against the opposition of Lord George Beresford, the outgoing candidate and powerful landowner in the district. Stuart was put forward by Daniel O'Connell's Catholic Association and O'Connell personally led his campaign here. Though not a Roman Catholic himself, Stuart was a man of liberal views and his election was an important step in the way to Catholic Emancipation which came three years later.

The Great Famine of 1846–1848 made itself felt in the city and the Corporation records of the period refer to several money grants to relieve the distress of the people. The fact that there were large quantities of rice in Waterford saved the city from the worst effects of disastrous shortage in the normal food supply.

Waterford 1850–1923
In the 19th century, great industries such as glass making and ship building thrived in the city. Thomas Francis Meagher (Meagher of the sword), an Irish nationalist, made the first Irish tricolour. He brought it back from France and it was first flown from a building on the Mall in Waterford.

In the early 20th century John Redmond was MP for Waterford and leader of the Irish Parliamentary Party, which almost achieved home rule and a new parliament for Ireland.

The Irish Civil War
After the evacuation of British troops (Devonshire Regiment) from Waterford city at the end of the Irish War of Independence, the military and police barracks were occupied by the Waterford Flying Column, under the leadership of George Lennon of Dungarvan, which was part of the combined (1921) Waterford Brigade under the command of Pax Whelan from Dungarvan. These men opposed the Anglo-Irish Treaty of 1922 and therefore took the Republican side when the Irish Civil War commenced with the firing upon the Four Courts in late June 1922.

Republicans considered Waterford to be the eastern stronghold of the "Munster Republic", and linchpin of the 'Limerick-Waterford line'. In late July 1922, therefore, National Army troops under Major General John T. Prout, composed of 450 men, one 18-pounder artillery piece and 4 machine guns arrived from Kilkenny to re-take the city as part of a national offensive. Prout's second in command was Patrick Paul, formerly commander of the IRA in East Waterford. Arrested by his former comrades for supporting the Free State, he escaped disguised as a nun, to join the government forces in Kilkenny. Waterford City fell on the 20th of July 1922, just a day after Limerick City had fallen to the Free State Forces

The Republicans had chosen to defend the city along the southern bank of the river Suir, occupying the military barracks, the prison and the Post Office. Prout placed his artillery on Mount Misery overlooking their positions and bombarded the Republicans until they were forced to evacuate the barracks and prison. However, the gun had to be brought down to Ferrybank to fire over open sights before the Republicans abandoned the Post Office. Some street fighting followed before the Irregulars fled the city and retreated westward to Mount Congreve in Kilmeadan. Two Free State soldiers were killed in the fighting and one Republican fighter. Five civilians were also killed.

References

Sources
Waterford: A Municipal Directory
Paul V Walsh, The Irish Civil War 1922–23 -A Study of the Conventional Phase.

External links
Mayors of Waterford City, P. M. Egan's History of Waterford, Waterford County Museum

Waterford city